Roberto Díaz may refer to:

 Roberto Díaz (footballer)
 Roberto Díaz (golfer)
 Roberto Díaz (violist)
 Roberto Díaz Herrera, Panamanian colonel